Med Maud over Polhavet is a Norwegian documentary film from 1926, directed by Odd Dahl.

The film photographer and air force officer Odd Dahl followed «Maud» for two years from 1922 and filmed the crew on board as they travelled through the unknown Arctic. Roald Amundsen had at this point left the ship for his venture to the North Pole. Odd Dahl filmed the scientific work and many critical situation the crew faced alone on the ice.

The crew consisted of:

 Oscar Wisting, Captain
 Harald Ulrik Sverdrup, oceanographer
 Odd Dahl, airman, photographer
 Finn Malmgren, meteorologist
 Gennady Olonkin, telegraphist
 Søren Syvertsen, machinist (died 1923)
 Karl Hansen, handyman
 Kakot, handyman from Sibiria

The film had its premiere at Victoria teater on 17 Mai 1926, but was previewed the day before with a lecture at the Universitetet i Oslo.

References

External links 
 
 Med Maud over Polhavet (1925) Filmbasen, accessed 13 August 2012
 MAUD-EKSPEDISJONEN (1918-1925) Fram Museum, accessed 13 August 2012

Norwegian documentary films
1926 films
Norwegian silent films
Norwegian black-and-white films
1926 documentary films